Isao Matsumiya is a Japanese politician. He attended the University of Tokyo. Matsumiya served as a member of the House of Representatives of Japan from 2000 to 2012. He was succeeded by Tomomi Inada for the 1st Fukui Prefecture office in 2005.

References 

Living people
People from Sabae, Fukui
Year of birth missing (living people)
Members of the House of Representatives (Japan)
Liberal Democratic Party (Japan) politicians
Democratic Party of Japan politicians
21st-century Japanese politicians
University of Tokyo alumni